Forest Hill (also Foresthill) is an unincorporated community in Summers County, West Virginia, United States.  It lies along West Virginia Route 12 to the southeast of the city of Hinton, the county seat of Summers County.   Its elevation is 1,926 feet (587 m).  It has a post office with the ZIP code 24935.

Forest Hill once contained a tobacco factory.

References

Unincorporated communities in Summers County, West Virginia
Unincorporated communities in West Virginia